Penilia is a genus of ctenopods in the family Sididae. There is one described species in Penilia, P. avirostris.

References

Further reading

 

Cladocera
Articles created by Qbugbot